The 2022–23 season is the 137th season in the history of Arsenal Football Club and the club's 97th consecutive season in the top flight. In addition to the domestic league, Arsenal competed in the FA Cup, the EFL Cup and the UEFA Europa League, which was their 37th European campaign.

The season covers the period from 1 July 2022 to 30 June 2023. It is unusual in that the fixture dates of domestic and European competitions were altered to accommodate the 2022 FIFA World Cup played in November and December 2022 in Qatar.

Review

Background

On 20 December 2019, Arsenal appointed former club captain Mikel Arteta – who was 37 years old then and had never managed before – as the new head coach on a three-and-a-half-year deal. On 1 August 2020, Arteta led the Gunners to a record-extending 14th FA Cup, becoming the first person to win the FA Cup as both captain and coach of Arsenal. After the Gunners triumphed in the 2020 FA Community Shield, Arteta's title was changed to manager. On 6 May 2022, Arsenal announced that Mikel Arteta had signed a new contract to the end of the 2024–25 campaign.

The 2021–22 season, which was documented in the Amazon Prime Video series All or Nothing: Arsenal, was a rollercoaster season for the Gunners. With their three consecutive defeats to open the Premier League campaign, the club dropped to 20th, sitting at the bottom of the table, which was their worst start to a season for 67 years. Since then, a new look Arsenal started to emerge with several academy graduates and new signings making a major impact. In fact, Arteta's side were the youngest team in the 2021–22 Premier League with an average starting age of 24 years and 308 days – more than a whole year younger than the next team. The Gunners had moved into the top four for several times between December 2021 and May 2022, but they finished the league season in fifth place, narrowly missing out on Champions League football.

Pre-season
It was reported on 29 June 2022 that the first-team players who were not in action for their respective countries since the end of the last campaign were back to the London Colney training ground for pre-season training.

On 4 July, the Gunners travelled to Germany for a mini training camp at Adidas headquarters in Herzogenaurach. Five academy players – Salah-Eddine Oulad M'Hand, Charlie Patino, Matt Smith, Lino Sousa and Reuell Walters – were with the first-team squad. On 8 July, Arsenal faced 2. Bundesliga side 1. FC Nürnberg at Max-Morlock-Stadion in Nuremberg. New signings Gabriel Jesus, Marquinhos and Matt Turner made their non-competitive debuts for the club in a 5–3 win. They returned to England on the next day.

On 11 July, Arsenal confirmed that the internationals who were in action for their respective countries in June were all back to London Colney. Two days later, manager Mikel Arteta named a 33-man squad for the trip to the United States where they would play three more friendlies. The 17-year-old defender Reuell Walters was the only academy player to travel with the first team to the US.

The Gunners faced fellow Premier League side Everton at M&T Bank Stadium in Baltimore, Maryland on 16 July. Gabriel Jesus and Bukayo Saka both scored one goal in the first half, helping the team win 2–0. Four days later, Arsenal took on Major League Soccer side Orlando City at Exploria Stadium in Orlando, Florida. The Gunners won 3–1 with Gabriel Martinelli scoring the opener, Eddie Nketiah scoring the second, and Reiss Nelson scoring the third.

On 23 July, the club played their third and final game of the USA tour – also the final game of the 2022 Florida Cup series – against Premier League side Chelsea at Camping World Stadium in Orlando. New signing Oleksandr Zinchenko made his non-competitive debut for Arsenal. In the 15th minute, Gabriel Jesus put the Gunners ahead with his fourth goal of pre-season. On 36 minutes, Martin Ødegaard added a further goal by sliding his shot low into the net. Bukayo Saka scored the third shortly after the hour mark. Albert Sambi Lokonga headed in a cross from Cédric Soares at the far post in the closing stages, making the score 4–0. Arsenal ended the 10-day trip to America with winning the Florida Cup.

The Gunners finished their pre-season campaign by thrashing La Liga side Sevilla 6–0 to claim the 2022 Emirates Cup on 30 July. The match saw four goals in the opening 20 minutes, courtesy of braces from Bukayo Saka and Gabriel Jesus, with the Brazilian completing his treble on 77 minutes before Eddie Nketiah netted in the final minute.

Before the start of the game against Sevilla, Arsenal announced that Martin Ødegaard was named their new men's first-team captain.

First-team transfers (summer transfer window)

Last season, French centre-back William Saliba spent a year on loan with Marseille in Ligue 1. During his time with Marseille, Saliba made 52 appearances in all competitions, and helped the club to second in the league, whilst also reaching the semi-finals of the inaugural Europa Conference League season. Saliba was named as Ligue 1 Young Player of the Year and was awarded a position in the Team of the Year. He also won his first caps for France. In early June 2022, Saliba confirmed he would return to north London from his Marseille loan spell. He would wear the number 12 shirt from the 2022–23 season.

On 19 May 2022, three days before the last game of the 2021–22 season, Arsenal announced that Greek defender Konstantinos Mavropanos joined Bundesliga side VfB Stuttgart in a permanent transfer. On 24 May, the club confirmed that Egyptian midfielder Mohamed Elneny had signed a new contract. On 10 June, Arsenal announced that they were to release nine players, two of whom, Alexandre Lacazette and Eddie Nketiah, made men's first-team appearances for the Gunners. Eight days later, the club confirmed English striker and academy graduate Eddie Nketiah signed a new long-term contract, and would wear the number 14 shirt from the 2022–23 season, having previously worn the number 30. The departure of French midfielder Matteo Guendouzi to Ligue 1 side Marseille was announced on 1 July. Two weeks later, the Gunners confirmed American defender Auston Trusty joined EFL Championship side Birmingham City F.C. on a season-long loan.

Arsenal announced their first signing of the summer transfer window on 10 June with 19-year-old Brazilian forward Marquinhos joining the club on a long-term contract from Série A side São Paulo. Eleven days later, the club announced the signing of 22-year-old Portuguese midfielder Fábio Vieira from Primeira Liga side Porto. He was given the number 21 shirt.

On 27 June, the Gunners confirmed that 28-year-old American goalkeeper Matt Turner had joined the club from Major League Soccer side New England Revolution, and would wear the number 30 shirt. As of June 2022, Turner had made 18 appearances for the United States. He wore the number one shirt and played every game as USA won the 2021 CONCACAF Gold Cup as hosts, keeping five clean sheets in the tournament, and earning the Golden Glove award. He was also honoured as MLS Goalkeeper of the Year in 2021. Turner has been an Arsenal fan since his teenage years.

In July 2022, the Gunners announced two signings of notable players from fellow Premier League side Manchester City, where Mikel Arteta spent three years and a half at as an assistant coach to Pep Guardiola before returning to Arsenal as head coach. On 4 July, 25-year-old Brazilian striker Gabriel Jesus joined Arsenal on a long-term contract, and was assigned the number 9 shirt. With the ability to play in several attacking positions, he is one of the leading strikers in the Premier League during his six seasons in Manchester City. On 22 July, 25-year-old Ukrainian left-sided player and Arsenal supporter Oleksandr Zinchenko, who is comfortable operating in midfield and defence, joined the club on a long-term contract, and would wear the number 35 shirt. Jesus and Zinchenko had both won four Premier League titles, the FA Cup and a number of EFL Cups as Manchester City players. Manager Arteta believed that Jesus and Zinchenko would help bring a winning mentality to the young squad.

The Gunners continued their summer exodus after signing five players. In late July, the club announced the loan departures of English goalkeeper and academy graduate Arthur Okonkwo and Portuguese defender Nuno Tavares to League Two side Crewe Alexandra and Ligue 1 side Marseille respectively.

On 2 August, Arsenal announced German goalkeeper Bernd Leno, who had made 125 appearances for the club in all competitions, joined fellow Premier League side Fulham in a permanent transfer. On the next day, the Gunners confirmed English goalkeeper Aaron Ramsdale took the number one shirt, moving from his previous number 32 following Leno's move to Fulham.

The departures of five first-team players were announced afterwards, as English forward and academy graduate Folarin Balogun joined Ligue 1 side Reims on a one-year loan, Uruguayan midfielder Lucas Torreira completed his transfer to Süper Lig side Galatasaray, Spanish defender Pablo Marí joined Serie A side A.C. Monza on a one-year loan deal, Icelandic goalkeeper Rúnar Alex Rúnarsson joined Süper Lig side Alanyaspor on loan for the 2022–23 season, and Ivorian winger Nicolas Pépé joined Ligue 1 side OGC Nice on a season-long loan.

On transfer deadline day, 1 September, two first-team players departed the club. English midfielder and academy graduate Ainsley Maitland-Niles joined fellow Premier League side Southampton on a one-year loan. Spanish defender and academy graduate Héctor Bellerín, who had made 239 first-team appearances in all competitions and won three FA Cups with the club, joined La Liga side Barcelona in a permanent transfer.

After the summer transfer window closed, there were twenty-four players in the first-team squad: three goalkeepers, eight defenders (including Oleksandr Zinchenko who plays as a full-back or midfielder), seven midfielders, and six forwards (including Bukayo Saka who plays as a winger or midfielder).

August
Just like the 2021–22 season, the Gunners began their campaign with a London derby away in the Premier League's first fixture on Friday, 5 August 2022, facing Crystal Palace at Selhurst Park, managed by former Arsenal captain Patrick Vieira. Returning loanee William Saliba and new signings Gabriel Jesus and Oleksandr Zinchenko made their competitive debuts for the team, and new recruit Matt Turner was named on the bench in a 2–0 win. Gabriel Martinelli opened the scoring in the 20th minute with a header assisted by Zinchenko, becoming the first Brazilian to net a season-opening goal of a Premier League campaign. In the 85th minute, Bukayo Saka's cross was deflected home by Marc Guéhi to ensure Mikel Arteta registered his 50th league victory, making him the second-quickest manager to reach 50 top-flight wins for Arsenal after Arsène Wenger.

Eight days later, the club played their first home match of the season against Leicester City. Gabriel Jesus netted twice in the first half on his home debut, becoming the first player to score more than once on his home Premier League debut for Arsenal. The visitors were awarded a penalty before half-time when striker Jamie Vardy and goalkeeper Aaron Ramsdale collided in the box, but the decision was overturned after referee Darren England checked the pitchside monitor. Despite a Wiliam Saliba own goal in the 53rd minute, Granit Xhaka scored just two minutes later. Moments after James Maddison scored for the Foxes, Gabriel Martinelli netted in the 75th minute, making the score 4–2.

It was reported on 15 August that manager Mikel Arteta appointed Granit Xhaka and Gabriel Jesus as the team's vice-captains to support skipper Martin Ødegaard.

On 20 August, Arsenal continued their Premier League campaign, facing newly promoted Bournemouth away at Dean Court. Summer signing Fábio Vieira was named among the substitutes for the first time. Martin Ødegaard netted twice within the opening 11 minutes. Wiliam Saliba scored with a left-footed curled shot from the edge of the box to the top right corner in the 54th minute, becoming the youngest Frenchman to score a Premier League goal for the Gunners since Samir Nasri in November 2008 vs Manchester United, and sealing a 3–0 victory. The win vaulted them to the top of the Premier League for the first time since 17 January 2016 against Stoke City, and ensured it was the first time Arsenal had won their opening three fixtures since the 2004–05 season. Bukayo Saka became the second youngest player to play 100 times for the club in the Premier League, behind Cesc Fàbregas.

On 26 August, the draw for the Europa League group stage was made. Arsenal were drawn in Group A, along with Dutch club PSV Eindhoven, Norwegian champions Bodø/Glimt and Swiss champions Zürich.

A day later, the Gunners played at home against newly promoted Fulham and former Arsenal goalkeeper Bernd Leno, who had signed with the Cottagers three days before the start of the Premier League season. New signing Marquinhos was on the bench for the first time. In the 56th minute, Gabriel Magalhães hesitated to pick a pass and lost possession on the edge of his own box to allow Aleksandar Mitrović to put Fulham ahead. Eight minutes later, Martin Ødegaard equalised with a deflected strike from Bukayo Saka's pass. In the 85th minute, a Martinelli corner caused havoc in a congested box and Gabriel Magalhães redeemed himself with a scrambled finish from close range, making the score 2–1. The win marked Arteta's 100th Premier League game in charge, and ensured it was the third time the club had won each of their first four games of a Premier League season, after 2003–04 and 2004–05. It was also the first time Arsenal conceded the first goal in the second half of a Premier League match and managed to come back and win since 26 December 2013 against West Ham United.

It was reported on 30 August that midfielder Mohamed Elneny suffered a significant injury in the match against Fulham. He would be ruled out for two months.

Arsenal's last match of the month was against 15th-placed Aston Villa and former Arsenal goalkeeper Emiliano Martínez at home on 31 August. In the 30th minute, Gabriel Jesus put his side in front by sweeping a low effort past Villa's Martinez after he had fumbled Granit Xhaka's deflected shot. The visitors found an equaliser directly from Douglas Luiz's corner in the 74th minute, as goalkeeper Aaron Ramsdale protested that he was impeded by Boubacar Kamara. The Gunners regained their lead with Gabriel Martinelli turning in Bukayo Saka's pinpoint cross just three minutes later. The 2–1 victory was Arsenal's 200th Premier League win since the club moved to Emirates Stadium from Highbury back in 2006. It was the fourth time Arsenal had started a top-flight season with a run of five wins, after 1930–31, 1947–48 and 2004–05. Mikel Arteta became the 11th manager to have won the first five games of a Premier League season, after Kevin Keegan, Carlo Ancelotti, Alex Ferguson, Arsène Wenger, Alan Curbishley, José Mourinho, Manuel Pellegrini, Pep Guardiola, Maurizio Sarri, and Jürgen Klopp.

Arsenal's performances in August led to several Premier League monthly award nominations. After guiding the Gunners to wins in all five of their Premier League matches of the month, Mikel Arteta was named Premier League Manager of the Month, winning the award for the third time following his previous successes in September 2021 and March 2022. Gabriel Jesus and Martin Ødegaard, who both scored three goals in August, were nominated for Premier League Player of the Month. Gabriel Jesus' chip against Leicester City and William Saliba's strike against Bournemouth were both shortlisted for Premier League Goal of the Month. Jesus and Ødegaard were also nominated for the PFA Premier League Fans' Player of the Month award. Jesus was voted as Arsenal's Player of the Month for August, and Saliba's strike against Bournemouth was voted as the club's Goal of the Month.

September
The club started September with a 1–3 defeat at Old Trafford to rivals Manchester United on Sunday, seeing their five-game winning start to the Premier League season come to an end. In the 12th minute, Gabriel Martinelli raced goalwards and finished past goalkeeper David de Gea, however video assistant referee Lee Mason suggested that referee Paul Tierney should check for a foul on Christian Eriksen by Martin Ødegaard in the build-up to the goal, and he changed his on-field decision. In the 35th minute, Antony scored for the hosts. Bukayo Saka levelled for the Gunners on the hour mark, ending his 10-game goal drought dating back to May. Marcus Rashford then netted twice in the 66th and 75th minute, helping the hosts to victory. Despite the loss, Arsenal remained top of the table. The game also saw new signing Fábio Vieira make his competitive debut for the team as a substitute in the 74th minute. It was reported on 21 December 2022 that Martinelli's disallowed opener was one of the six incorrect VAR interventions in the first part of the Premier League season before the break for the World Cup.

After missing out on continental action last term, the Gunners began their fifth Europa League campaign on 8 September with a trip to Switzerland in a group stage match against Zürich, the reigning Swiss Super League champions. This was the first time the two teams played each other in a European game. New signings Marquinhos and Matt Turner made their competitive debuts and fellow new recruit Fábio Vieira got his full debut in a 2–1 win. In the 16th minute, Arsenal took the lead through Marquinhos converting from Eddie Nketiah's cutback. Zürich equalised in the 44th minute courtesy of Mirlind Kryeziu's penalty after Nketiah fouled Fidan Aliti inside the box. At half-time, the news broke of the passing of Her Majesty Queen Elizabeth II, and Arsenal's players returned to the field wearing black armbands in respect, while a minute's silence was held before the start of the second half. In the 62nd minute, Nketiah atoned for his earlier error by heading the deciding goal at the far post from Marquinho's cross, becoming the fifth Englishman to score in three consecutive starts in the Europa League. The winner prompted a muted response from players on the pitch as well as manager Mikel Arteta, who also wore a black armband, on the sidelines in light of the news from Buckingham Palace.

Arsenal's home fixture against Everton, which was originally due to be played on 11 September, was postponed two days beforehand along with the entire weekend's English football league programme, as a mark of respect following the passing of Her Majesty Queen Elizabeth II. The Europa League group stage match between Arsenal and Eredivisie side PSV Eindhoven, originally scheduled to be played on 15 September, was postponed due to the severe limitations on police resources and organisational issues related to the ongoing events surrounding the national mourning for Queen Elizabeth II. It was announced on 14 September that the league match between Arsenal and Manchester City, which was originally scheduled for 19 October, was postponed to accommodate Arsenal's rearranged Europa League fixture against PSV Eindhoven, following discussions between UEFA, the Premier League and relevant clubs.

Ahead of the first international break of the season, the Gunners faced 8th-placed Brentford away at Brentford Community Stadium on 18 September. Before kick-off, there was a minute's silence in tribute to Queen Elizabeth II, followed by a rendition of the national anthem "God Save the King". In the 17th minute, William Saliba opened the scoring with a header from Bukayo Saka's corner. Eleven minutes later, Gabriel Jesus doubled Arsenal's advantage with another header from Granit Xhaka's chip. In the 49th minute, Fábio Vieira collected a Saka pass in space outside the Brentford box and unleashed a strike that crashed in off the post, marking his first Premier League start, and sealing a 3–0 win. Eddie Nketiah made his 100th appearance for the team as a substitute in the 78th minute. As a schoolboy midfielder at the age of 15 years and 181 days, Ethan Nwaneri came off the bench to replace Fábio Vieira in second-half stoppage time. He became the youngest player to ever appear in the Premier League – breaking the record previously held by Harvey Elliott, and the all-time English top-flight record held since August 1964 by former Sunderland goalkeeper Derek Forster, by three days. He also became Arsenal's youngest-ever player in any competition, breaking the previous record of 16 years and 177 days, set by Cesc Fàbregas in the 2003–04 League Cup. In the post-match presser, manager Mikel Arteta explained that they had to name Nwaneri and two other under-21 players on the bench because the first team had several injuries, especially the injury of midfielder Martin Ødegaard, and a "gut feeling" was behind his decision to send Nwaneri on.

On 29 September, Arsenal announced that academy graduate Emile Smith Rowe had undergone surgery to repair a damaged tendon in his groin. He would return to full training in December.

Gabriel Jesus's impressive form was recognised with a nomination for September's PFA Premier League Fans' Player of the Month. Granit Xhaka was voted as Arsenal's Player of the Month for September, and Fábio Vieira's strike against Brentford was voted as the club's Goal of the Month.

October
October 2022 was a gruelling month for Arsenal. They played five Premier League matches and four Europa League matches in 29 days, including two home games against Tottenham and Liverpool, and two games away to Norwegian side Bodø/Glimt and Dutch side PSV Eindhoven.

On 1 October following the international break, it was North London derby day in the league as the club played at home to 3rd-placed Tottenham. Thomas Partey opened the scoring in the 20th minute with a right-footed curled shot from 25 yards assisted by Ben White. It was the first time Partey scored from outside the box for Arsenal, with what was his 65th attempt in all competitions. Spurs equalised in the 31st minute courtesy of Harry Kane's penalty after Gabriel Magalhães fouled Richarlison inside the box. In the 49th minute, Gabriel Jesus capitalised on a mix-up between goalkeeper Hugo Lloris and defender Cristian Romero to put the Gunners in front from close range shortly after Lloris spilled a Bukayo Saka shot. On 62 minutes, Emerson Royal's reckless foul tackle from behind on Gabriel Martinelli prompted referee Anthony Taylor to produce a straight red card. Five minutes later, Granit Xhaka drilled a low shot past Lloris from the centre of the box, making the score 3–1. The win kept Arsenal on top of the Premier League table, and meant that it was the first time the club had won each of their last three Premier League home games against Tottenham since September 2013.

The Gunners resumed their Europa League campaign on 6 October with a home game against Bodø/Glimt, the defending Eliteserien champions. This was the first time the two teams met in a European competition. American goalkeeper Matt Turner made his home debut and kept his first clean sheet for Arsenal in a 3–0 win. Eddie Nketiah netted on his fourth Europa League start in a row by tapping home the rebound from Kieran Tierney's strike in the 23rd minute. Four minutes later, Fábio Vieira crossed for Rob Holding at the back post to head in a second. On 84 minutes, Gabriel Jesus danced past several defenders in the box to tee up Vieira to fire into the net. The win put the Gunners top of their Europa League group by two points over PSV Eindhoven with a game in hand.

On 9 October, the club played their third consecutive home match of the month against 9th-placed Liverpool, a team that Arsenal had only won one of their last 14 Premier League matches against since the 2015–16 season and had failed to score in their past six meetings with in all competitions. The Gunners took the lead after just 58 seconds when captain Martin Ødegaard slipped the ball through three defenders to Gabriel Martinelli and he tucked the ball home. Liverpool equalised through Darwin Núñez in the 34th minute. At the end of the first half, Arsenal reclaimed the lead with Bukayo Saka tucking in Martinelli's low pass through the six-yard box at the back post from a swift counter. Liverpool again got back on terms through substitute Roberto Firmino in the 53rd minute. After Gabriel Jesus was fouled by Thiago inside the box, Saka scored the deciding goal from the penalty spot in the 76th minute, making the score 3–2, and sealing the Gunners' first win over Liverpool since July 2020. This was the fourth time Arsenal had won at least eight of their first nine league matches in a top-flight campaign, after 1947–48, 2004–05 and 2007–08.

Four days later, the Gunners travelled to Bodø, Norway – a town located just north of the Arctic Circle – to face Eliteserien side Bodø/Glimt. The game took place on an artificial pitch at Aspmyra Stadion, where the Norwegian team had won each of their last 14 home matches in European competition. On 24 minutes, Bukayo Saka's toe-poked effort was blocked by a defender, the rebound bounced off his face and past the goalkeeper. It was the only goal of the game, and the Gunners won 1–0.

Arsenal continued their Premier League campaign on 16 October, facing 14th-placed Leeds United away at Elland Road. The game saw goalkeeper Aaron Ramsdale produce a man of the match display as the Gunners won 1–0. In a unique start to the game, a power cut outside the stadium after 60 seconds forced a 40-minute suspension, because referee Chris Kavanagh found that he lost communication with VAR, which would play a crucial role when the match eventually resumed. Once they got going again, Bukayo Saka scored the winning goal from a tight angle in the 35th minute, assisted by Martin Ødegaard. After a VAR check, Leeds were awarded a penalty in the 62nd minute when William Saliba was adjudged to have handled the ball inside the box, but striker Patrick Bamford dragged his effort wide of Ramsdale's left-hand post. In stoppage time, referee Kavanagh sent off defender Gabriel Magalhães for kicking out at Bamford and awarded the hosts a second penalty after discussing with his assistant, but both decisions were overturned after Kavanagh was suggested by VAR to review the incident on the pitchside monitor. This was the club's best start to a top-flight campaign as the Gunners had won nine of their first ten league games for the first time ever. The result also moved Arsenal four points clear at the top of the Premier League.

On 20 October, the Gunners played the postponed Europa League match at home to Dutch side PSV Eindhoven, which finished as runners-up in the 2021–22 Eredivisie. On 70 minutes, Granit Xhaka drove a right-footed effort into the bottom left corner from Takehiro Tomiyasu's right-wing cross, helping the hosts to a third straight 1–0 victory. The win marked Kieran Tierney's 100th appearance for the team, and ensured Arsenal qualified for the Europa League knockout stage with two group games to spare.

On the next day, the club announced that Brazilian centre-back Gabriel Magalhães had signed a new long-term contract.

Arsenal headed to the south coast of England on 23 October facing 14th-placed Southampton at St. Mary's Stadium. In the 11th minute, Granit Xhaka put his side ahead with a right-footed strike from Ben White's cross. But the Gunners were unable to add a second goal, and the hosts found a leveller through Stuart Armstrong on 65 minutes. It ended Arsenal's eight-game winning run, and was also their first draw in 28 Premier League matches since January 2022.

On 27 October, the Gunners travelled to the Netherlands to face Eredivisie side PSV Eindhoven at Philips Stadion. After a tight first-half finished goalless, Joey Veerman and Luuk de Jong both scored one goal in an eight-minute period, sealing a 2–0 win for the hosts, and ending Arsenal's four-game winning run in the Europa League. This was the first time the Gunners suffered an away defeat in the group stage of the Europa League since November 2017. The game also saw Gabriel Martinelli make his 100th appearance for the team in all competitions, and Granit Xhaka make his 50th Europa League appearance, becoming the second Swiss player to reach this milestone.

Arsenal's ninth and last match of the month was against newly promoted Nottingham Forest at home on 30 October. Before the start of the game, the team paid tribute to their on-loan defender Pablo Marí, who was recovering after being stabbed in an Italian supermarket on 27 October. The players did the same by holding up a shirt with Mari's name on it after Gabriel Martinelli opened the scoring with a diving header. Before the half hour mark, Bukayo Saka was forced off with an injury and was replaced by academy graduate Reiss Nelson, who netted twice in the early stages of the second half, becoming the first Englishman to score a brace as a substitute for the Gunners in a Premier League game. Thomas Partey added the fourth with a long-range strike before a Martin Ødegaard shot made it 5–0. The victory was Arsenal's 300th at Emirates Stadium since the club moved from Highbury in 2006. The win also marked Granit Xhaka's 200th Premier League appearance for the team, and kept them on top of the table.

The Gunners' performances in October led to several Premier League monthly award nominations. After leading Arsenal to four wins and a draw from their five Premier League games of the month, Mikel Arteta was nominated for Premier League Manager of the Month. Granit Xhaka, who scored two goals for the team in October, was shortlisted for Premier League Player of the Month. Thomas Partey's long-range effort against Tottenham was nominated for the Premier League Goal of the Month award. Xhaka was also nominated for the PFA Premier League Fans' Player of the Month award. Xhaka was voted as Arsenal's Player of the Month for October, and Partey's strike against Tottenham was voted as the club's Goal of the Month.

November
On 3 November, the Gunners hosted Swiss side Zürich at Emirates Stadium in their final Europa League group game. Gabriel Jesus started as Arsenal's captain for the first time, and Mohamed Elneny made his return from a hamstring injury after two months out. In the 17th minute, Kieran Tierney scored the only goal of the game with a left-footed shot from 20 yards to the bottom right corner, helping the team win 1–0. The victory meant that the Gunners had finished top of their group in all five of their participations in the UEFA Europa League. This was the first time Arsenal had kept a clean sheet in all three of their home group-stage games in a single European campaign since the 2008–09 season. They would go straight into the Europa League round of 16 in March 2023, skipping the knockout play-off round in February.

Arsenal went on to face rivals Chelsea at Stamford Bridge on 6 November, a match that saw manager Mikel Arteta reach 150 games in all competitions – the same number of appearances he made for the Gunners as a player. Oleksandr Zinchenko was back in the starting line-up after missing nine games with a calf injury. Gabriel Magalhães's close-range finish from Bukayo Saka's corner in the 63rd minute earned the visitors a 1–0 win. This was Arteta's 87th victory in charge of Arsenal – more than any of his predecessors, including George Graham and Arsene Wenger, over the equivalent period.

Three days later, the Gunners entered the EFL Cup in the third round, facing Premier League side Brighton & Hove Albion at home. The 20-year-old Estonia international keeper and academy graduate Karl Hein made his competitive debut for the first team and started in goal, becoming the fourth Estonian to start for a Premier League side. Arsenal took the lead through Eddie Nketiah's 20th-minute strike after Reiss Nelson's run from the halfway line. The Seagulls equalised on 27 minutes courtesy of Danny Welbeck's penalty after Hein slipped and tripped him inside the box. Two counter-attacking goals from Brighton's Kaoru Mitoma and Tariq Lamptey in the second half saw the visitors win 3–1 and end the Gunners' 12-match winning run at home. This was the second time in 20 seasons that Arsenal had failed to progress past the third round of the EFL Cup (formerly League Cup).

On 12 November, Arteta's side played their last game before the 44-day World Cup break against 19th-placed Wolverhampton Wanderers away at Molineux Stadium. In the 54th minute, captain Martin Ødegaard tapped Fábio Vieira's cross in from close range. On 75 minutes, the Norwegian drilled in the rebound after Gabriel Martinelli's low effort was denied by the goalkeeper, making the score 2–0. The win moved Arsenal five points clear at the top of the Premier League table, the biggest lead they had at the top of the league since December 2013. The Gunners would be top on Christmas Day for the first time since 2007.

On 18 November, the club appointed Edu Gaspar, a member of "The Invincibles" team of the 2003–04 Arsenal season who re-joined the Gunners as technical director from the Brazilian Football Confederation in July 2019, as their first-ever sporting director.

It was reported on 28 November that the first-team players who were not in action for their respective countries were back to London Colney for mid-season friendlies in Dubai, United Arab Emirates and London.

World Cup participants

The 2022 FIFA World Cup took place in Qatar from 20 November to 18 December. Ten Arsenal players were named in squads for the tournament: Gabriel Jesus and Gabriel Martinelli (Brazil), Aaron Ramsdale, Bukayo Saka and Ben White (England), William Saliba (France), Thomas Partey (Ghana), Takehiro Tomiyasu (Japan), Granit Xhaka (as Switzerland's captain), and Matt Turner (United States).

The group stage of the competition was played from 20 November to 2 December. Six Arsenal players made their World Cup debuts for their respective countries: Bukayo Saka, Matt Turner, Takehiro Tomiyasu, Thomas Partey, Gabriel Martinelli, and William Saliba.

On 21 November, Bukayo Saka scored a brace in England's first group game, becoming the youngest player to score more than one goal in his first World Cup game since German Franz Beckenbauer in 1966.

Matt Turner, who wore the USA's number one shirt and started in goal during the tournament, kept two clean sheets in three group games, becoming the first US goalkeeper to record multiple clean sheets in one edition of the FIFA World Cup since 1930.

On 2 December, Thomas Partey saw his World Cup campaign come to an end after Ghana were eliminated at the group stage. The other Arsenal players would remain for the knockout stage which would be played from 3 to 18 December.

However, only William Saliba reached the final week of the competition, while the others were eliminated either in the round of 16 or quarter-finals. Saliba's France were defeated in the World Cup final on 18 December.

December
On 4 December, manager Mikel Arteta named a 27-man squad – including thirteen academy players – for the trip to the United Arab Emirates where they would play two friendlies in the Dubai Super Cup.

Two days later, Arsenal confirmed that striker Gabriel Jesus had undergone surgery to his right knee after suffering an injury during Brazil's World Cup group stage match against Cameroon on 2 December. The club did not give any timescale on his return.

The Gunners faced Ligue 1 side Lyon at Al Maktoum Stadium in Dubai on 8 December. Gabriel Magalhães, Eddie Nketiah and Fábio Vieira each scored one goal in the first half, helping the team win 3–0. The friendly also feature a post-match penalty shootout and Arsenal earned an extra point by edging that 2–1, with young goalkeeper Karl Hein making four saves out of five.

Arteta's side played their second and final game of the Dubai tour against Serie A side Milan at Al Maktoum Stadium on 13 December. The Gunners won 2–1 with Martin Ødegaard scoring the opener and Reiss Nelson scoring the second. Karl Hein made a save in the post-match penalty shootout as Arsenal triumphed 4–3 and earned a bonus point. This ensured that the Gunners claimed the Dubai Super Cup with eight points.

After flying back to England, Arsenal hosted Serie A side Juventus for their final friendly during the World Cup break at Emirates Stadium on 17 December. A Granit Xhaka own goal and a strike from Samuel Iling-Junior snatched victory for the Italian team. The game also saw Reiss Nelson limp off with a muscle injury in the 22nd minute.

The Gunners' first action after the World Cup was a Boxing Day fixture at home against 16th-placed West Ham United and former Arsenal goalkeeper Łukasz Fabiański. The Hammers took the lead on 27 minutes when Jarrod Bowen was judged to have been fouled inside the box by William Saliba, allowing Saïd Benrahma to smash a penalty down the middle. Arteta's side were awarded a penalty for handball in first-half stoppage time, but the decision was overturned after referee Michael Oliver checked the pitchside monitor. In the 53rd minute, Bukayo Saka scored the equaliser from close range after collecting Martin Ødegaard's scuffed shot. Just five minutes later, Gabriel Martinelli fired a low left-footed shot past Fabiański from a narrow angle, assisted by Granit Xhaka. On 69 minutes, Ødegaard's pass picked out Eddie Nketiah, who led the line in the absence of the injured Gabriel Jesus, and the striker spun in the box before shooting into the bottom left corner. The 3–1 win marked the three-year anniversary of Mikel Arteta's first game as Arsenal manager. Former Gunners boss Arsène Wenger, who spent 22 years in north London, returned to Emirates Stadium for the first time since leaving the club in May 2018. He watched the game from the directors' box and heard his name sang by the home crowd.

On New Year's Eve, Arsenal travelled to the south coast of England to play their final game of 2022 – also the last Premier League fixture of the year – against 7th-placed Brighton & Hove Albion, who knocked them out of the EFL Cup via a 3–1 victory at Emirates Stadium in November. Before kick-off, there was a minute's applause in tribute to Brazilian football legend Pelé, who died on 29 December, at the age of 82. After just 66 seconds, Bukayo Saka latched onto a rebound from Gabriel Martinelli's shot to tuck the ball home. It was Arsenal's earliest away goal in the Premier League since May 2013, when Theo Walcott scored after 20 seconds versus Queens Park Rangers. In the 39th minute, skipper Martin Ødegaard put his side 2–0 ahead with a curled shot from the centre of the box to the bottom right corner. On 47 minutes, Eddie Nketiah poked the ball in from close range after Brighton's goalkeeper Robert Sánchez spilled Martinelli's shot from a tight angle. In the 65th minute, Kaoru Mitoma pulled one back and reduced the deficit for the Seagulls. Just 6 minutes later, Ødegaard whipped a pass into space for Martinelli to race through and fire between Sanchez's legs to score a goal, restoring the three-goal advantage for the Gunners. On 77 minutes, William Saliba was casual on the edge of his own box, allowing Evan Ferguson his chance to pull another goal back. Brighton's Mitoma looked to have scored again with stoppage-time to come, but the goal was ruled out by VAR for offside in the build-up. The 4–2 victory took Arsenal seven points clear at the top of the Premier League. They became the fifth team in English top-flight history to pick up as many as 43 points from the first 16 games in a season.

The Gunners' performances in November and December led to several Premier League monthly award nominations. After guiding Arsenal to four wins from four Premier League games either side of the World Cup, Mikel Arteta picked up his second Premier League Manager of the Month award of the campaign, winning the award for the fourth time since December 2019. Martin Ødegaard and Bukayo Saka were shortlisted for Premier League Player of the Month, which was won by Ødegaard. He became the first Arsenal player to win the award since Pierre-Emerick Aubameyang in September 2019. It was also the first time since March 2015 the club scooped both awards, when manager Arsène Wenger and striker Olivier Giroud were the recipients. Eddie Nketiah's strike against West Ham United was nominated for the Premier League Goal of the Month award. Ødegaard and Saka were also nominated for the PFA Premier League Fans' Player of the Month award. Ben White and Bukayo Saka were voted as the club's Player of the Month for November and December, respectively. Nketiah's strike against West Ham United was voted as December's Arsenal Goal of the Month.

January
Arteta's side would face a tough January before reaching the Premier League campaign's midpoint, with 5th-placed Tottenham Hotspur and 4th-placed Manchester United to follow after 3rd-placed Newcastle United.

Arsenal started 2023 with a home game against Newcastle on 3 January, hoping to extend their lead at the top of the table. However, neither team was able to break the deadlock and the game finished 0–0. This was the first time the Gunners failed to score in a Premier League match since May 2022, and also the first time they failed to win at home in the Premier League since April 2022.

On 9 January, the Gunners entered the FA Cup in the third round, facing League One side Oxford United away at Kassam Stadium. In the 63rd minute, Mohamed Elneny opened the scoring with a header from Fábio Vieira's free-kick. On 70 minutes, Vieira claimed another assist when he threaded a pass into the path of Eddie Nketiah, who raced through the backline, rounded the goalkeeper and slid the ball home. In the 75th minute, Emile Smith Rowe came off the bench to make his first appearance since September following groin surgery. A minute later, Nketiah added his second goal of the night with a chip over the keeper from Gabriel Martinelli's pass. The 3–0 result advanced them to the next round, in which they were drawn away to Manchester City on the final weekend of January.

Two days later, the club unveiled eight new pieces of artwork that would adorn the exterior of Emirates Stadium: Victoria Concordia Crescit, Remember Who You Are, Invincible, Come To See The Arsenal, Eighteen Eighty-Six, We All Follow The Arsenal, Future Brilliance, and Found a Place Where We Belong.

On 15 January, Arsenal faced rivals Tottenham at Tottenham Hotspur Stadium in the second North London derby of the season. In the 14th minute, Bukayo Saka's cross was deflected home by Spurs goalkeeper Hugo Lloris. On 36 minutes, Martin Ødegaard doubled Arsenal's lead with a long-range strike assisted by Saka. Spurs did create chances and moments of anxiety for the visitors, especially in the second half; but they could not find a way past Arsenal keeper Aaron Ramsdale, who produced a man of the match display with seven saves, including a vital stop with his foot to deny Ryan Sessegnon on 52 minutes, helping his side record the first clean sheet in North London derbies since Mikel Arteta took charge of Arsenal in December 2019. The 2–0 win was the Gunners' first Premier League victory at Spurs' stadium since March 2014, and secured their first league double over Tottenham since the 2013–14 season. The result moved Arsenal eight points clear at the top of the Premier League.

An incident occurred at the final whistle after the Gunners won away at their nearest rivals. Live television footage showed keeper Ramsdale went to retrieve his water bottle when a Spurs supporter jumped onto the advertising hoarding behind the goal and kicked the England international in the back. Ramsdale was led away from the area after the Spurs fan scurried away through the stands. "Violence towards players is completely unacceptable," the Professional Footballers' Association said in a statement. "Players have a right to be safe in their place of work. When a player is attacked, we expect the laws and regulations that are in place to protect players to be properly enforced." England's national governing body, the Football Association, said they "strongly condemn" the incident of "wholly unacceptable behaviour". A statement from the Premier League said: "There is no place in football for acts of violence, and under no circumstance should players be attacked or fear for their safety at games." On 17 January, the Metropolitan Police said a man was charged after the incident. A month later, a 35-year-old man from east London pleaded guilty at Uxbridge Magistrates' Court in west London to assault by beating, going onto an area adjacent to the playing area and throwing a missile onto a football playing area. The Metropolitan Police said in a statement: "He was sentenced to 100 hours of unpaid work, £100 compensation to the victim, costs of £85 and victim surcharge of £114. He would also be subject to a four-year football banning order."

On 22 January, Arsenal played at home to rivals Manchester United, the only team that had beaten them in the Premier League this season so far. The Gunners' first-choice centre-back pairing Gabriel Magalhães and William Saliba, and winger Bukayo Saka were treading a disciplinary tightrope, because they had each received four bookings of the Premier League season before this game. A booking in this match would rule them out for the upcoming league game. The suspension threshold would rise to ten bookings after this game. New signing Leandro Trossard was among the substitutes after completing his transfer; and new recruit Jakub Kiwior was present at Emirates Stadium, even though his arrival at the club was not yet announced. In the 17th minute, Marcus Rashford gave United the lead with a long-range strike. Seven minutes later, the Gunners levelled through Eddie Nketiah, whose header from Granit Xhaka's cross made it 18 goals in his last 26 starts for the club. On 53 minutes, Bukayo Saka cut in from the right and arrowed a long-range screamer across goalkeeper David de Gea into the far corner of the net, becoming the third Arsenal player to have scored in three Premier League games in a row against Manchester United, after Freddie Ljungberg and Thierry Henry. But the visitors were back on level terms six minutes later as Lisandro Martínez looped a header into the net. As the game entered the final ten minutes, the Gunners kept putting United under pressure. Leandro Trossard came on for his debut to bolster the attack, and was involved in the 90th-minute winner. After the ball bounced around in the area, it fell to Nketiah who poked home from close range and sent the Emirates crowd into raptures. This was Nketiah's 13th goal in his last 13 starts at Emirates Stadium, making him the first Arsenal player to score two goals in a Premier League game against United since Alexis Sanchez in October 2015. The 3–2 victory extended the Gunners' unbeaten home record against United to five league games and league record this season to 13 matches, and put them a five-point advantage at the top of the Premier League with a game in hand. Arsenal had 50 points from 19 games at the halfway stage of the league season – their best start to a top-flight campaign – 15 more than they had at the same stage last season.

The Gunners headed to Manchester City on 27 January for their first meeting of the season with Pep Guardiola's side at Etihad Stadium in the FA Cup fourth round. New recruit Leandro Trossard was handed his first Arsenal start, and Jakub Kiwior was named on the bench following his signing with the club earlier in the week. In the 64th minute, Nathan Aké scored the only goal of the tight game with a low shot, helping the hosts win 1–0. The defeat meant that Arteta's side had exited the EFL Cup and FA Cup in the early stages, and would concentrate on the Premier League, as well as the Europa League, which would return in March.

On 31 January, the club announced that midfielder Mohamed Elneny had undergone surgery to his right knee after suffering an injury in a training session. He would be ruled out for an extended period of time.

Arsenal's performances in January led to several Premier League monthly award nominations. After leading the Gunners to two wins and a draw from their Premier League games against three teams vying for a place in the top four, Mikel Arteta was named Premier League Manager of the Month for the third time this season – the fifth time since December 2019. He was the first manager to win the award in successive months since Manchester City's Pep Guardiola did so in November and December of 2021. Arteta also became the first Arsenal manager to win the award three times in a single campaign, which was the first time that had happened in the league since Liverpool's Jürgen Klopp won five in the 2019–20 season. Bukayo Saka was shortlisted for Premier League Player of the Month, and his long-range screamer against Manchester United was nominated for the Premier League Goal of the Month award. Aaron Ramsdale's vital save to deny Tottenham's Ryan Sessegnon was included on the shortlist for Premier League Save of the Month, making him the first Arsenal goalkeeper to be nominated for the award since its inception during the 2022–23 season. Saka was also shortlisted for the PFA Premier League Fans' Player of the Month award. Oleksandr Zinchenko was voted as Arsenal's Player of the Month for January, and Saka's strike against Manchester United was voted as the club's Goal of the Month.

First-team transfers (winter transfer window)

On 16 January, the club confirmed English goalkeeper and academy graduate Arthur Okonkwo was recalled from his loan at League Two side Crewe Alexandra and joined Austrian Bundesliga side Sturm Graz on loan for the remainder of the season.

Arsenal announced their first signing of the winter transfer window on 20 January with 28-year-old Belgian forward Leandro Trossard joining the club on a long-term contract from fellow Premier League side Brighton & Hove Albion. He would wear the number 19 shirt. With the ability to play in several attacking positions, Trossard scored seven goals in sixteen Premier League games for Brighton this season. He also made three appearances for Belgium at the 2022 World Cup.

On 23 January, the club confirmed that they had signed 22-year-old Polish defender Jakub Kiwior from Serie A side Spezia. He would wear the number 15 shirt. A versatile defender, Kiwior was capable of playing both as a centre-back and as a defensive midfielder during his time with the Italian side. As of December 2022, he had won nine caps for Poland and started all four of their matches at the 2022 World Cup.

On transfer deadline day, 31 January, the Gunners announced that 31-year-old Italian midfielder Jorginho had joined the club from Premier League side Chelsea and would wear the number 20 shirt. Jorginho had made 143 Premier League appearances for Chelsea, winning the UEFA Europa League, UEFA Champions League, UEFA Super Cup and FIFA Club World Cup during his time at the club. Capped 46 times, he was part of the Italy squad which won UEFA Euro 2020. In 2021, he was named UEFA Men's Player of the Year and placed third in the Ballon d'Or.

The departures of two first-team players were announced on the same day, as Brazilian forward Marquinhos joined EFL Championship side Norwich City on loan for the remainder of the season, and Belgian midfielder Albert Sambi Lokonga joined fellow Premier League side Crystal Palace on loan until June 2023.

On 1 February, Arsenal confirmed that Portuguese defender Cédric Soares had joined Premier League side Fulham on loan until the end of the 2022–23 season.

After the winter transfer window closed, there were twenty-four players in the first-team squad: three goalkeepers, eight defenders (including Oleksandr Zinchenko who plays as a full-back or midfielder), seven midfielders, and six forwards (including Bukayo Saka who plays as a winger or midfielder).

February
On 3 February, the club announced that Brazilian forward Gabriel Martinelli had penned a new long-term contract.

Arteta's side continued their Premier League campaign on 4 February with an away game against 19th-placed Everton, a team that appointed Sean Dyche as their new manager five days ago. This was the first time the Gunners named the same starting XI in five consecutive league games since May 2015. In the 59th minute, deadline-day signing Jorginho made his debut for the team as a substitute. Just a minute later, James Tarkowski netted the only goal of the match to clinch victory for the hosts. This was Arsenal's second Premier League defeat of the season and their first in the last 14 games. Despite the loss, the Gunners remained top of the table by five points with a game in hand.

On Saturday, 11 February, Arsenal played at home against 7th-placed Brentford. With the game still goalless on the hour mark, manager Mikel Arteta turned to his bench, bringing on winter signing Leandro Trossard. Within five minutes the Belgian forward converted a low Bukayo Saka cross at the far post, netting his first goal for the club. In the 74th minute, Ivan Toney nodded in Christian Nørgaard's cross from close range for the visitors. The goal was eventually awarded by the video assistant referee Lee Mason after he spent two minutes 26 seconds checking whether Brentford's Ethan Pinnock had blocked Gabriel Magalhães from Mathias Jensen's free-kick when in an offside position. However, Mason failed to identify Brentford's Nørgaard, who assisted the goal, was offside before making the crucial cross for Toney to score, and it later emerged that no lines had been drawn to check for a possible offside. The Gunners had to try to break down the Brentford defensive block once again, but they couldn't find a way through. This was the first time Arsenal failed to win a Premier League home game in which they scored first since 1 January 2022. The 1–1 draw left them to settle for a three-point advantage over Manchester City with a game in hand. In the post-match presser, Arteta said "different rules" were applied for Toney's Brentford equaliser. On the same day, Brighton & Hove Albion had a goal incorrectly ruled out for offside in their draw at Crystal Palace, because the offside line was wrongly drawn by the video assistant referee.

On Sunday, the Professional Game Match Officials Limited (PGMOL) – the body responsible for match officials in English professional football – said in a statement: "PGMOL can confirm its Chief Refereeing Officer Howard Webb has contacted both Arsenal and Brighton & Hove Albion to acknowledge and explain the significant errors in the VAR process in their respective Premier League fixtures on Saturday. Both incidents, which were due to human error and related to the analysis of offside situations, are being thoroughly reviewed by PGMOL." It was not the first time a controversial VAR call had contributed towards the Gunners dropping points this season. In fact, it had happened on four separate occasions so far: Gabriel Martinelli's goal was disallowed after VAR check at Manchester United on 4 September; Gabriel Jesus was denied a penalty at Southampton on 23 October; at least one penalty was denied at the Emirates against Newcastle United on 3 January; and Ivan Toney's Brentford goal stood after VAR check on 11 February. PGMOL confirmed on 17 February that Lee Mason had left the organisation by mutual consent.

On 15 February, Arteta's side played the postponed Premier League match at home to 2nd-placed and reigning champions Manchester City. Gabriel Magalhães made his 100th appearance for the club in all competitions, and new recruit Jorginho got his full debut as he replaced Thomas Partey, who had suffered a muscular injury before this game. In the 24th minute, Takehiro Tomiyasu left his backpass short for goalkeeper Aaron Ramsdale, allowing City's Kevin De Bruyne to nip in and lob the ball into an unguarded net. The Gunners drew level on 42 minutes through a Bukayo Saka penalty after City goalkeeper Ederson fouled Eddie Nketiah inside the box. Pep Guardiola's side were also awarded a penalty on 57 minutes, but the decision was overturned for offside by VAR. In the 72nd minute, a loose pass by Gabriel Magalhães was hoovered up by City, and they rapidly worked the ball out to Jack Grealish, whose low shot took a deflection off Tomiyasu on its way into the net. The visitors added a third on 82 minutes when Erling Haaland fired a low finish into the far corner. The 1–3 defeat saw Arsenal's unbeaten home record come to an end after 14 league games, and meant that the Gunners had lost their last 11 Premier League games against Manchester City since the 2017–18 season, their longest losing run against an opponent in their league history. After the match, Arsenal swapped places with City at the top of the table on goal difference with a game in hand.

The Gunners travelled to Villa Park on 18 February to play against 11th-placed Aston Villa, managed by former Arsenal boss Unai Emery, who took charge of the team in November 2022, and was facing his former club for the first time in the Premier League. In a six-goal thriller Arteta's side twice came from behind to win the match, while scoring twice in the stoppage time. On five minutes, Ollie Watkins put the hosts ahead with a counter-attacking goal. In the 16th minute, Ben White's cross from the right was half cleared, and Bukayo Saka smashed the bouncing ball into the net beyond former Arsenal goalkeeper Emiliano Martínez. Fifteen minutes later, Villa restored the lead through Philippe Coutinho's strike. On the hour Oleksandr Zinchenko collected a Martin Ødegaard pass in space outside the box and fired in at the near post for his first Arsenal goal – indeed his first Premier League goal from 92 games in six seasons. In the 82nd minute, Aaron Ramsdale made a vital save to keep Arsenal in the game by tipping of recently subbed in, Leon Bailey's effort on to the bar. In stoppage time, Jorginho's long-range shot came off the crossbar and bounced in off goalkeeper Martínez's head to put the Gunners ahead. Martínez then went up the other end for a late Villa corner, and was caught out on the break when Arsenal cleared to Fábio Vieira who released Gabriel Martinelli to walk it home. The dramatic 4–2 victory ended the Gunners' run of three Premier League games without a win, and took them two points clear at the top of the league with a game in hand.

On 21 February, Arsenal confirmed that Egyptian midfielder Mohamed Elneny, who underwent surgery to his right knee in January, had extended his contract with the club until June 2024.

The Gunners' last match of the month was against 14th-placed Leicester City at King Power Stadium on 25 February. Oleksandr Zinchenko started as Arsenal's captain for the first time as a mark of respect in the week of the first anniversary of Russia's invasion of his homeland Ukraine; and Leandro Trossard led the line as a false nine, because Eddie Nketiah had picked up a knock before the game and Gabriel Jesus continued his recovery from injury. On 26 minutes, Bukayo Saka's corner was punched away by Leicester goalkeeper Danny Ward, and Granit Xhaka collected the ball and played a pass to Trossard who curled a shot from outside the box into the top corner. However, the goal was disallowed by referee Craig Pawson following a VAR review for a foul on keeper Ward by Ben White. In the opening minute of the second half, Trossard pulled wide and fed a nutmeg pass to Gabriel Martinelli who bursted into the box and stroked the ball into the far corner. This was the 200th goal the Gunners had scored in the Premier League under Mikel Arteta. The 1–0 win was Arsenal's 10th away win in the Premier League this season – the fastest they had reached 10 away victories in any league campaign in their history (13 matches) – more than in the whole of last season. Goalkeeper Aaron Ramsdale recorded his eighth clean sheet in a Premier League away game this season, the most by any Arsenal keeper since Jens Lehmann had kept eight in the unbeaten 2003–04 season. After the game, Mikel Arteta said "Today we wanted to win for him [Zinchenko], for his loved ones, and for all the Ukrainian people that I think has inspired the world with that fighting spirit and with the togetherness they showed as a country. If we can add some happiness today to them and reflecting on who Alex [Zinchenko] is for us, it was a good opportunity, so I'm delighted to dedicate that win to them."

Though Arteta's side wobbled in February, some players were still recognised with monthly award nominations. Aaron Ramsdale's vital save to deny Aston Villa's Leon Bailey was shortlisted for February's Premier League Save of the Month, making him the first Arsenal goalkeeper to be nominated for the award in successive months since its inception during the 2022–23 season. Bukayo Saka was nominated for the PFA Premier League Fans' Player of the Month award. Oleksandr Zinchenko was voted as Arsenal's Player of the Month for February, and his strike against Aston Villa was voted as the club's Goal of the Month.

March
On 1 March, the Gunners played the postponed Premier League match at home to 18th-placed Everton, who beat them 1–0 at Goodison Park just over three weeks ago. Five minutes before half-time, Oleksandr Zinchenko – a left-back only in name in this game – provided a through ball from the right-hand side of midfield to Bukayo Saka who spun past Everton's defender and fired a right-footed shot past his international colleague Jordan Pickford from a narrow angle. The goal was Saka's 50th goal involvement (goal or assist) in the Premier League. At 21 years and 177 days, he became the sixth youngest player to reach the milestone in the competition, and the youngest Arsenal player since Cesc Fàbregas achieved it in April 2008. Saka also became the first Arsenal player – the eighth player in Premier League history – to score 10 or more goals in multiple Premier League seasons before turning 22. In first-half stoppage time, Everton's Idrissa Gueye was caught dawdling on the ball, Saka nicked it off his toe and immediately played in Gabriel Martinelli who raced through and slotted the ball past Pickford. The goal was initially ruled out for offside by the linesman's flag, but the decision was overturned after a VAR check. This meant that both Saka and Martinelli netted their 10th Premier League goals of the season, and Arsenal became the first team to have two players reach double figures for goals this campaign. The Gunners added a third on 71 minutes when Martin Ødegaard tucked home a Leandro Trossard cutback. In the 80th minute, Martinelli scored his second goal of the night by tapping Eddie Nketiah's cross in from close range. Goalkeeper Aaron Ramsdale made a double save in second-half stoppage time, helping the hosts win 4–0. This was Arsenal's 100th league victory against Everton, making the Gunners the first team in English league history to register 100 wins against a specific opponent. The result moved them five points clear at the top of the Premier League, and ensured it was the third time the club had picked up at least 60 points from the first 25 games in a single Premier League campaign, after 2003–04 and 2007–08.

Three days later, Mikel Arteta's side played at home against 19th-placed Bournemouth, a match that saw the Gunners fall behind after just nine seconds and come back from two goals down with half an hour left to beat the Cherries 3–2 with a stunning 97th-minute winner from substitute Reiss Nelson. This was the first time since January 1986 that Arsenal named a starting line-up without a single player to have made a competitive appearance under Arsène Wenger, who was in charge of the Gunners from 1996 to 2018. Bournemouth took a surprise lead after just 9.11 seconds through Philip Billing from a preconceived kick-off routine. It was the second-quickest goal scored in the Premier League era. In the 20th minute, keeper Aaron Ramsdale made a vital save to deny Dango Ouattara as the visitors countered from an Arsenal corner. Two minutes later, Leandro Trossard was forced off with an injury and was replaced by academy graduate Emile Smith Rowe. This meant that Arsenal's first three centre-forwards – Gabriel Jesus, Eddie Nketiah and Leandro Trossard – were all injured at the moment, and Gabriel Martinelli had to play up top, in a role he had never been in this season. On 57 minutes, the hosts fell further behind to Marcos Senesi's header from a corner. In the 62nd minute, A Bukayo Saka corner was cleared to Smith Rowe, and he headed back into the six-yard box for Thomas Partey to tap home at the back post. On 69 minutes, academy graduate Reiss Nelson made his third Premier League appearance of the season as he came off the bench to replace Smith Rowe. Just a minute later, Nelson sent in a curling cross for defender Ben White, who drove it goalwards and over the line before Bournemouth keeper Neto pushed it away, with the goal-line technology confirming the ball had completely crossed the line. It was White's first Arsenal goal since he joined the club in 2021 and his first Premier League goal from 94 games. With referee Chris Kavanagh set to blow the final whistle in the 7th minute of stoppage time, a Martin Ødegaard corner was cleared as far as Reiss Nelson, who chested it down and smashed a left-footed shot through a crowd of bodies and past visiting goalkeeper. The goal sparked bedlam on the pitch and the Arsenal bench, and sent Emirates Stadium into ecstasy. Nelson's last-gasp stunner (96:57) was the Gunners' second-latest 90th-minute winner on record in the Premier League (since 2006–07), after Alexis Sánchez's penalty against Burnley in January 2017 (97:14). Arteta's side had netted three 90th-minute winners in the Premier League this campaign, the joint-most 90th-minute winners Arsenal had scored in a single season in the competition. This was the first time in Premier League history that a team scored a 90th-minute winning goal after having gone behind in the first minute since August 2007. It was also the first time the Gunners had won a Premier League game in which they trailed by two or more goals since February 2012.

On 9 March, Arsenal travelled to Lisbon, Portugal to face Sporting CP in the Europa League last-16 first leg. Winter signing Jakub Kiwior made his debut for the first team in a 2–2 draw. The Gunners took the lead in the 22nd minute when William Saliba headed home from Fábio Vieira's corner. Twelve minutes later, the hosts levelled in almost identical fashion when Gonçalo Inácio nodded in from a corner. On 55 minutes, Paulinho tapped in from close range to put Sporting ahead. Arsenal equalised in the 62nd minute when Granit Xhaka's attempted through ball deflected off Hidemasa Morita and into his own net. The result ensured the Gunners would start on level terms when the two teams meet in the return leg at Emirates Stadium On 16 March.

Arteta's side continued their Premier League campaign on 12 March, facing 7th-placed Fulham and former Arsenal goalkeeper Bernd Leno away at Craven Cottage. Leandro Trossard started as a false nine, and Gabriel Jesus was included in the Gunners' matchday squad for the first time since November 2022 following his knee injury. In the 16th minute, Gabriel Martinelli's shot was parried by Leno into Antonee Robinson, and the ball ended up in the back of the Fulham net. But after a VAR check, the goal was ruled out for offside in the build-up. Gabriel Magalhães opened the scoring on 21 minutes with a header from Trossard's corner. Arteta's side doubled the lead with a counter-attacking goal in the 26th minute when Granit Xhaka took William Saliba's sweeping pass from Arsenal's penalty area, dribbled the ball forward a few paces and fed it to Trossard, who crossed for Martinelli to head home at the far post. The Gunners added a third in first-half stoppage time as Martin Ødegaard tucked home from Trossard's chip, making him the first player in Premier League history to assist three goals in the first half of an away game. On 77 minutes, Gabriel Jesus made his first Arsenal appearance in four months to replace Trossard. The 3–0 win was Arteta's 100th victory in all competitions as Gunners boss, making him the ninth Arsenal manager to reach the milestone, and ensuring the Gunners became the first team in English Football League history to win five consecutive London derbies away from home without conceding a single goal. Arteta's side had won 27 matches in all competitions so far this season, already more than in the whole of the last campaign.

Arsenal's fine form during the season was recognised at the 2023 London Football Awards, which took place on 13 March. Martin Ødegaard picked up the Premier League Player of the Year award, Bukayo Saka won the Men's Young Player of the Year award, Aaron Ramsdale received the Goalkeeper of the Year award, and Mikel Arteta was named Manager of the Year.

On 15 March, the club announced that Arsenal owner Stan Kroenke and his son Josh Kroenke had been appointed as co-chairs whilst Tim Lewis had become executive vice-chair in a boardroom restructure.

A week after the first leg of the Europa League round of 16 match, the Gunners hosted Sporting CP in the second leg on 16 March. In the 7th minute, Takehiro Tomiyasu limped off with a injury and was replaced by Ben White. On 19 minutes, Granit Xhaka tucked in the rebound from Gabriel Martinelli's shot to put Arsenal ahead. Two minutes later, William Saliba was also withdrawn to be replaced by Rob Holding. Pedro Gonçalves levelled for the visitors on 62 minutes with a stunning 46-yard chip from just inside the Gunners' half, catching goalkeeper Aaron Ramsdale off his line. There were no further goals in regular time and with the away goals rule no longer applying after the 2020–21 UEFA season, both teams headed for the extra thirty minutes. Arsenal had several chances to score in extra-time, but the Portuguese side held out to force the game to penalties, despite Manuel Ugarte receiving a second yellow card for a dangerous challenge on Bukayo Saka late on. Martin Ødegaard, Saka and Leandro Trossard all scored from the penalty spot, but Martinelli's effort was saved by visiting goalkeeper Antonio Adán, and Nuno Santos lashed into the net past Ramsdale to seal a 5–3 win on penalties for Sporting. This was the first penalty shootout the Gunners had competed in at Emirates Stadium, and their 23rd overall in all competitions. The result meant that Arteta's side had exited the Europa League, and domestic league football would be their sole focus for the rest of the season.

Ahead of the last international break of the season, the Gunners played at home on 19 March against 12th-placed Crystal Palace, who sacked manager and former Arsenal captain Patrick Vieira two days ago. Rob Holding made his first Premier League start of the season after replacing injured William Saliba in the Europa League last-16 second leg match. Gabriel Martinelli opened the scoring on 28 minutes with a left-footed strike – his sixth goal in six Premier League games – from Bukayo Saka's right-footed cross, making Saka the first player to reach double figures for both goals and assists in the Premier League this campaign, and the first Arsenal player to do so since Alexis Sánchez in 2016–17. In the 43rd minute, Ben White fed a pass to Saka who fired a low shot past teenage goalkeeper Joe Whitworth. Granit Xhaka made it three for the hosts on 55 minutes with a close-range finish from Leandro Trossard's assist. Eight minutes later, Palace's Jeffrey Schlupp pulled one back from close range following a corner. Saka restored the Gunners' three-goal advantage on 74 minutes with a strike from substitute Kieran Tierney's pull-back. In the 86th minute, Jakub Kiwior made his home and Premier League debut as a substitute. The 4–1 victory extended Arsenal's winning streak to six in the Premier League this season, and put them an eight-point advantage over Manchester City at the top of the Premier League with City having a game in hand. This was the first time since 2004 that the club had won four consecutive Premier League matches by scoring at least three goals in each of them. The Gunners became the first side in English Football League history to win nine London derbies in a single league campaign.

First-team coaching staff

Notes:
 * – Individual Development Coach

First-team squad
Notes:
 Players and squad numbers last updated on 31 January 2023.
 Appearances and goals last updated on 19 March 2023, including all competitions for senior teams.
 Flags indicate national team as defined under FIFA eligibility rules. Players may hold more than one non-FIFA nationality.
 HG – Players who fulfil the Premier League's "Home Grown Player" criteria.
 U21 – Players who were registered by Arsenal as Under-21 Players on the 2022–23 Premier League Squad List.
 ListB – Players who were registered by Arsenal on the 2022–23 UEFA Europa League Squad List B.

Squad number changes
Notes:
 Players and squad numbers last updated on 31 January 2023.
 The list is sorted by new squad number.

Academy players
The following Arsenal Academy players featured in a first-team matchday squad during the 2022–23 season.

Notes:
 Players and squad numbers last updated on 19 March 2023.
 Flags indicate national team as defined under FIFA eligibility rules. Players may hold more than one non-FIFA nationality.
 HG – Players who fulfil the Premier League's "Home Grown Player" criteria.
 U21 – Players who were registered by Arsenal as Under-21 Players on the 2022–23 Premier League Squad List.
 ListB – Players who were registered by Arsenal on the 2022–23 UEFA Europa League Squad List B.

New contracts and transfers

New contracts

Contract extensions

Transfers in

Total expenditure:  £155.5 million (excluding add-ons and undisclosed figures)

Transfers out

Total income:  £17 million (excluding undisclosed figures)

Loans out

Kits
Supplier: Adidas / Sponsor: Fly Emirates / Sleeve sponsor: Visit Rwanda

Kit information
This is Adidas's fourth year supplying Arsenal kit, having taken over from Puma at the beginning of the 2019–20 season. On 30 September 2022, Arsenal announced the extension of the partnership with Adidas until 2030.

Home: The club confirmed on 19 May 2022 that their new home kit for the 2022–23 season would debut in the final home game of the 2021–22 season. The home kit uses Arsenal's traditional colours of red and white. The shirt has a red body and white sleeves, and is complemented by white shorts and red socks. The new feature added to the home kit is a lightning bolt pattern appearing on the collar and socks.
Away: On 18 July 2022, the Gunners released their new away kit. The all-black shirt combines a bronze cannon badge and metallic trims with an all-over AFC graphic, and is partnered with black shorts and socks. White shorts and grey socks were used in some away games when there was a colour clash with the home team's kit. It was reported that Arsenal sold £1 million of the new away kit on launch day, a new club's record for first-day kit sales.
Third: The new third kit was revealed on 29 July 2022, one day before the 2022 Emirates Cup match. It is the first pink outfield shirt in Arsenal's history. The shirt features an all-over ermine print, and is combined with navy shorts and pink socks.
No More Red: On 6 January 2023, Arsenal announced that they were going to extend their "No More Red" campaign for a second season; an initiative that aims to combat knife crime in the capital. The same commemorative kit from last season was used this season, with typical white features set upon a slightly off-white kit.
Goalkeeper: The new goalkeeper kits are based on Adidas's goalkeeper template for the season.

Kit usage

Pre-season and friendlies

On 19 April 2022, Arsenal announced that they would travel to the United States in July to compete in the FC Series as part of their preparations during pre-season with matches against Orlando City and Chelsea. On 10 May, a further US tour friendly was confirmed against Everton in The Charm City Match in July. On 18 May, La Liga side Sevilla revealed their participation in the 2022 Emirates Cup in late July. On 6 June, Arsenal announced that they would travel to Germany to face 1. FC Nürnberg as part of a pre-season training camp at the Adidas headquarters in July, before heading to the US.

In order to prepare for the resumption of the Premier League following the mid-season World Cup break, Arsenal announced that they were going to partake in a warm-weather training camp in Dubai, United Arab Emirates in early December. This involved participating in the Dubai Super Cup against Lyon and Milan on 8 and 13 December respectively, at the Al Maktoum Stadium. Points, in addition to those earned in the initial 90 minutes, would be awarded through a mandatory penalty shootout; the team with most points overall after two matches (alongside a fourth participant in fellow Premier League side Liverpool) would be crowned champions of the competition. Arsenal then announced a final friendly against Serie A side Juventus to be played, at home, on 17 December, 9 days before the resumption of their domestic season.

Friendlies

Florida Cup

Emirates Cup

Dubai Super Cup

Competitions

Overall record

Premier League

League table

Results summary

Results by round

Matches

The league fixtures were announced on 16 June 2022.

FA Cup

As a Premier League side, Arsenal entered the FA Cup in the third round. They were drawn away to League One side Oxford United. In the fourth round, they were drawn away to fellow Premier League side Manchester City.

EFL Cup

As the Gunners were competing in UEFA competition in the 2022–23 season, they entered the EFL Cup in the third round. They were drawn at home to fellow Premier League side Brighton & Hove Albion.

UEFA Europa League

The draw for the group stage was held on 26 August 2022.

Group stage

Knockout phase

Round of 16
As a result of finishing top of the group, Arsenal advanced directly to the round of 16. The draw was held on 24 February 2023. As a seeded team, Arsenal played the second leg at home.

Statistics

Appearances and goals
Includes all competitions. Players with no appearances not included in the list.

Goalscorers
Includes all competitions. The list is sorted by squad number when total goals are equal. Players with no goals not included in the list.

Assists
Includes all competitions. The list is sorted by squad number when total assists are equal. Players with no assists not included in the list.

Disciplinary record
Includes all competitions. The list is sorted by squad number when total cards are equal. Players with no cards not included in the list.

Clean sheets
Includes all competitions. The list is sorted by squad number when total clean sheets are equal. Numbers in parentheses represent games where both goalkeepers participated and both kept a clean sheet; the number in parentheses is awarded to the goalkeeper who was substituted on, whilst a full clean sheet is awarded to the goalkeeper who was on the field at the start of play. Goalkeepers with no clean sheets not included in the list.

Captains
Includes all competitions. The list is sorted by squad number when total number of games where a player started as captain are equal. Players with no games started as captain not included in the list.

Awards and nominations

Monthly awards

Arsenal Player of the Month
The winner of the award was chosen via a poll on the club's official website.

Arsenal Goal of the Month
The winner of the award was chosen from goals scored by men's, women's and academy teams via a poll on the club's official website.

Premier League Manager of the Month
The winner of the award was chosen by a combination of an online public vote and a panel of experts.

Mikel Arteta picked up three Premier League's Manager of the Month awards in the 2022–23 season. He had five awards during his time as Arsenal manager.

Premier League Player of the Month
The winner of the award was chosen by a combination of an online public vote, a panel of experts, and the captain of each Premier League club.

Martin Ødegaard won the Premier League's Player of the Month award after league-high six goal involvements (goals and assists combined) in November and December 2022.

Premier League Goal of the Month
The winner of the award was chosen by a combination of an online public vote and a panel of experts.

Premier League Save of the Month
The winner of the award was chosen by a combination of an online public vote and a panel of experts.

PFA Premier League Fans' Player of the Month
The winner of the PFA Premier League Fans' Player of the Month award was chosen by an online public vote.

Yearly awards

London Football Awards

Milestones

Manager

150th game in charge
Mikel Arteta took charge of his 150th Arsenal game in all competitions on 6 November 2022.

100th win in charge
Mikel Arteta registered his 100th win in all competitions as Gunners boss on 12 March 2023.

Players

Debuts
The following players made their competitive debuts for Arsenal's first team during the 2022–23 season.

50th appearances
The following players made their 50th appearances for Arsenal's first team during the 2022–23 season.

100th appearances
The following players made their 100th appearances for Arsenal's first team during the 2022–23 season.

150th appearances
The following players made their 150th appearances for Arsenal's first team during the 2022–23 season.

First goals
The following players scored their first goals for Arsenal's first team during the 2022–23 season.

First assists
The following players registered their first assists for Arsenal's first team during the 2022–23 season.

First clean sheets
The following goalkeepers kept their first clean sheets for Arsenal's first team during the 2022–23 season.

Injuries
The following first-team players were unavailable for at least 30 days after suffering an injury during the 2022–23 season.

References

Sources

External links
 

Arsenal F.C. seasons
Arsenal
Arsenal F.C.
Arsenal
Arsenal
Arsenal